This is a list of public art in the London Borough of Lambeth.


Brixton

Clapham

Kennington

Lambeth

South Bank

Stockwell

Streatham

Vauxhall

Waterloo

West Norwood

See also
 National Covid Memorial Wall
 Skylon (Festival of Britain)

References

Bibliography

External links
 

Lambeth
Lambeth
Tourist attractions in the London Borough of Lambeth